The Never Ending Tour is the popular name for Bob Dylan's endless touring schedule since June 7, 1988.  93 shows in all were performed during this year.

Background
The Never Ending Tour 1990 started off with a tour called the Fastbreak tour where Dylan performed in the United States, Brazil, France and England in less than thirty days. This tour started off with a one-off performance at Toad's Place in New Haven Connecticut. Dylan performed four sets that evening and performed a total of fifty songs; this was also the longest of Dylan's concerts to date. During the tour Dylan also performed four concerts in Paris, France and six sold out concerts at the Hammersmith Apollo in London, England.

On May 29, Dylan started a sixteen date tour of Canada and the United States, ten of the concerts took place in Canada.

After finishing his short North American tour Dylan embarked on an even shorter European tour. This tour only comprised nine concerts, several of which were major concert appearances, including the Roskilde Festival in Denmark, Rock Werchter in Belgium and the Montreux Jazz Festival in Switzerland.

Dylan returned to North America to perform a twenty-three date late summer tour of the United States and Canada including several appearances at state fairs. The tour started on August 12 in Edmonton, Alberta, Canada and came to an end a month later on September 12 in Mesa, Arizona. Dylan performed in a total of twenty cities in fourteen states and provinces.

Dylan started his final tour of the year on October 11 in Brookville, New York. This tour consisted of thirty concerts in the United States. During the roué Dylan performed a five night run at the Beacon Theatre in New York City. The tour finally came to a close on November 18 at the Fox Theatre in Detroit, Michigan after ninety-three concerts.

Tour dates

Notes

References

External links

BobLinks – Comprehensive log of concerts and set lists
Bjorner's Still on the Road – Information on recording sessions and performances

Bob Dylan concert tours
1990 concert tours